Liberty Lake may refer to:

 Liberty Lake (Nevada)
 Liberty Lake (Washington)
 Liberty Lake, Washington, a city located on the lake.

See also
 Liberty Lake, Virginia